Senegal participated at the 2018 Summer Youth Olympics in Buenos Aires, Argentina from 6 October to 18 October 2018. The nation will host the next Youth Olympic Games in 2022 at Dakar.

Athletics

Fencing

Senegal was given a quota to compete by the tripartite committee.

 Boys' Sabre - 1 quota

Swimming

References

2018 in Senegalese sport
Nations at the 2018 Summer Youth Olympics
Senegal at the Youth Olympics